Bloom is a 2004 compilation album by Gabriel & Dresden that collects songs by the duo and various other artists from the Nettwerk label. The first three tracks were originally featured on the EP Arcadia.

Track listing

Notes
 "External Key" contains a cappella from Andain's "Beautiful Things".
 "Someone Else" contains a cappella from Motorcycle's "As The Rush Comes". 
 "Nova Satori" (Josh Gabriel mix) title written on release as "Nova Santori" (Josh Gabriel mix). 
 "Totally Fascinated" (M.I.K.E.'s Fascinated mix) is mislabeled on the CD's track list as "Electric Eclipse" by Push.

Personnel
 Little C – artwork design
 Gabriel & Dresden – DJ mix
 Rick Essig – mastering
 Jason Hull – cover photography

Disc one
 Dave Dresden – songwriting on 1–3, 9, production on 3, 4, 9
 Josh Gabriel – songwriting on 1–3, 9, production on 3, 4, 9, engineering on 3
 David Gropper and Martin Gore – songwriting on 4
 Andain – production on 4
 Michael Burns – songwriting, vocals on 5
 Pierre Marchand – songwriting, production, engineering, mixing on 6
 Sarah McLachlan – songwriting on 6
 David Westerlund, Özgür Can – songwriting, production on 7
 Justin Scott Dixon – songwriting, production on 8
 Autan and Fra Soler – songwriting on 10
 Guy Gerber – songwriting, production on 11

Disc two
 Dave Dresden – songwriting, production on 2, 6, 11
 Josh Gabriel – songwriting, production on 2, 6, 8, 9, 11
 Tetsuo Sakae – songwriting on 1
 Michael Targanaski – songwriting, production on 2
 Lili Haydn – songwriting, production on 3
 Peter Rafelson – songwriting on 3
 Bill Laswell – production on 3
 Robert Palazuelos – songwriting, production on 4
 David Gropper – production on 4
 Dido Armstrong, Rollo Armstrong – songwriting, production on 5
 Peter Houser – songwriting on 6
 Bassbin Twins – production on 6
 Zoë Johnston – vocals, songwriting on 7
 Jono Grant, Paavo Siljamäki, Tony McGuinness – songwriting on 7
 Above & Beyond – production on 7
 Rowan Gabriel – fetal heartbeat on 8
 Kristy Gabriel – additional vocals on 8
 M.I.K.E. – songwriting, production on 10
 Jes Brieden – songwriting on 11

Reviews

References 

2004 remix albums
Gabriel & Dresden albums
Nettwerk Records remix albums